Algeria comprises  square kilometers of land, more than 80% of which is desert, in North Africa, between Morocco and Tunisia. It is the largest country in Africa. Its Arabic name, Al Jazair (the islands), is believed to derive from the rocky islands along the coastline of the Mediterranean Sea. The northern portion, an area of mountains, valleys, and plateaus between the Mediterranean and the Sahara Desert, forms an integral part of the section of North Africa known as the Maghreb. This area includes Morocco, Tunisia, and the northwestern portion of Libya known historically as Tripolitania.

Size and boundaries
Land boundaries:Total: Border countries: Libya , Mali , Mauritania , Morocco , Niger , Tunisia , Western Sahara .

Area – comparative: slightly larger than the Democratic Republic of the Congo and Saudi Arabia

Coastline: 

Maritime claims: Territorial sea: , contiguous zone: ; exclusive fishing zone:

Geographic regions

The Tell 
The fertile Tell is the country's heartland, containing most of its cities and population. Made up of hills and plains of the narrow coastal region, the several Tell Atlas mountain ranges, and the intermediate valleys and basins, the Tell extends eastward from the Moroccan border to the mountains of the Grande Kabylie and the Bejaia Plain on the east. Its eastern terminus is the Soummam River.

The best agricultural areas are the gentle hills extending 100 kilometers westward from Algiers; the Mitidja Plain, which was a malarial swamp before being cleared by the French; and the Bejaia Plain. The alluvial soils in these areas permitted the French to establish magnificent vineyards and citrus groves. By contrast, in the great valley of the Chelif River and other interior valleys and basins, aridity and excessive summer heat have limited the development of agriculture. The Grande Kabylie is a zone of impoverished small farm villages tucked into convoluted mountains.

The High Plateaus and the Saharan Atlas

Stretching from the Moroccan border the Tell Atlas, including the Djebel Babor formation, is the dominant northwestern mountain range. Stretching more than 600 kilometers eastward from the Moroccan border, the high plateau area (often referred to by the French name Hautes Plaines or Hauts Plateaux) consist of undulating, steppe-like plains lying between the Tell and Saharan Atlas ranges. The climate is so dry that these plains are sometimes thought of as part of the Sahara. The plateau area is covered by alluvial debris formed when the mountains eroded. An occasional ridge projects through the alluvial cover to interrupt the monotony of the landscape.

Higher and more continuous than the Tell Atlas, the Sahara Atlas range is formed of three massifs: the Ksour Range near the Moroccan border, the Amour Range, and the Ouled-Naïl Range south of Algiers. The mountains, which receive more rainfall than those of the High Plateaus, include some good grazing land. Watercourses on the southern slopes of these massifs disappear into the desert but supply the wells of numerous oases along the northern edge of the desert, of which Biskra, Laghouat, and Béchar are the most prominent.

Northeastern Algeria
Eastern Algeria consists of a massif area extensively dissected into mountains, plains, and basins. It differs from the western portion of the country in that its prominent topographic features do not parallel the coast. In its southern sector, the steep cliffs and long ridges of the Aurès Mountains create an almost impenetrable refuge that has played an important part in the history of the Maghrib since Roman times. Near the northern coast, the Petite Kabylie Mountains are separated from the Grande Kabylie range at the eastward limits of the Tell by the Soummam River. The coast is predominantly mountainous in the far eastern part of the country, but limited plains provide hinterlands for the port cities of Bejaïa, Skikda, and Annaba. In the interior of the region, extensive high plains mark the region around Sétif and Constantine; these plains were developed during the French colonial period as the principal centers of grain cultivation. Near Constantine, salt marshes offer seasonal grazing grounds to seminomadic sheep herders.

The Sahara
The desert is an otherworldly place, scarcely considered an integral part of the country. Far from being covered wholly by sweeps of sand, however, it is a region of great diversity. Immense areas of sand dunes called areg (sing., erg) occupy about one-quarter of the territory. Surrounding the Ahaggar are sandstone plateaus, cut into deep gorges by ancient rivers, and to the west a desert of pebbles stretches to the Mali frontier.

The desert consists of readily distinguishable northern and southern sectors, the northern sector extending southward a little less than half the distance to the Niger and Mali frontiers. The north, less arid than the south, supports most of the few persons who live in the region and contains most of the desert's oases. Sand dunes are the most prominent features of this area's topography, but between the desert areas of the Grand Erg Oriental and the Grand Erg Occidental (Great Western Erg) and extending north to the Atlas Saharien are plateaus, including the Tademaït and a complex limestone structure called the M'zab where the Mozabite Berbers have settled. The southern zone of the Sahara is almost totally arid and is inhabited only by the Tuareg nomads and, recently, by oil camp workers. Barren rock predominates, but in some parts of Ahaggar and Tassili n'Ajjer alluvial deposits permit garden farming.

Climate and hydrology

Northern Algeria is in the temperate zone and enjoys a mild, Mediterranean climate. It lies within approximately the same latitudes as southern California and has somewhat similar climatic conditions. Its broken topography, however, provides sharp local contrasts in both prevailing temperatures and incidence of rainfall. Year-to-year variations in climatic conditions are also common. This area, the most inhabited in Algeria, is commonly referred to as the Tell.

Winters are not cold, but the humidity is high and houses are seldom adequately heated. In eastern Algeria, the average temperatures are somewhat lower, and on the steppes of the High Plateaus winter temperatures hover only a few degrees above freezing. A prominent feature of the climate in this region is the sirocco, a dusty, choking south wind blowing off the desert, sometimes at gale force. This wind also occasionally reaches into the coastal Tell.

In Algeria only a relatively small corner of the Sahara lies across the Tropic of Cancer in the torrid zone, but even in winter, midday desert temperatures can be very hot. After sunset, however, the clear, dry air permits rapid loss of heat, and the nights are cool to chilly. Enormous daily ranges in temperature are recorded.

Rainfall is fairly abundant along the coastal part of the Tell, ranging from  annually, the amount of precipitation increasing from west to east. Farther inland the rainfall is less plentiful. Prevailing winds that are easterly and northeasterly in summer change to westerly and northerly in winter and carry with them a general increase in precipitation from September to December, a decrease in the late winter and spring months, and a near absence of rainfall during the summer months.

Terrain

Clearing of land for agricultural use and cutting of timber over the centuries have severely reduced the once bountiful forest wealth. Forest fires have also taken their toll. In the higher and wetter portions of the Tell Atlas, cork oak and Aleppo pine grow in thick soils. At lower levels on thinner soils, drought-resistant shrubs predominate. The grapevine is indigenous to the coastal lowlands, and grasses and scrub cover the High Plateaus. On the Saharan Atlas, little survives of the once extensive forests of Atlas cedar that have been exploited for fuel and timber since antiquity.

The forest reserves in Algeria were severely reduced during the colonial period. By contrast, woodlands in 1830 had covered . In the mid-1970s, however, the government embarked on a vast reforestation program to help control erosion, which was estimated to affect  of arable land annually.

The barrage vert consists principally of Aleppo pine, a species that can thrive in areas of scanty rainfall. It is designed to restore a damaged ecological balance and to halt the northern encroachment of the Sahara. By the early 1980s, the desert had already penetrated the hilly gap between the Saharan Atlas and the Aurès Mountains as far as the town of Bou Saâda, a point well within the High Plateaus region. The barrage vert project was ended in the late 1980s because of lack of funds.

Algeria had a 2018 Forest Landscape Integrity Index mean score of 5.22/10, ranking it 106th globally out of 172 countries.

Statistics
Natural resources: petroleum, natural gas, iron ore, phosphates, uranium, lead, zinc

Natural hazards: mountainous areas subject to severe earthquakes; mudslides and floods in rainy season

Environment – current issues: air pollution in major cities; soil erosion from overgrazing and other poor farming practices; desertification; dumping of raw sewage, petroleum refining wastes, and other industrial effluents is leading to the pollution of rivers and coastal waters; Mediterranean Sea, in particular, becoming polluted from oil wastes, soil erosion, and fertilizer runoff; inadequate supplies of potable water

Environment – international agreements:
party to: Biodiversity, Climate Change, Climate Change-Kyoto Protocol, Climate Change-Paris Agreement, Comprehensive Nuclear Test Ban, Desertification, Endangered Species, Environmental Modification, Hazardous Wastes, Law of the Sea, Ozone Layer Protection, Ship Pollution, Wetlands signed, but not ratified: Nuclear Test Ban

Protected areas
Algeria has a number of protected areas including National Parks and nature reserves. An example of such a protected area is the Djebel Babor Nature Reserve within the Djebel Babor Mountains; the Djebel Babor is also one of the few relict habitats for the endangered Barbary macaque, Macaca sylvanus.

The national parks in Algeria are: Ahaggar, Belezma, Chréa, Djurdjura, El Kala, Gouraya, Tassili n'Ajjer, Taza, Théniet El Had, and Tlemcen.

Extreme points 

Elevation extremes:
 Lowest point: Chott Melrhir: 
 Highest point: Mount Tahat: 
Points that are farther north, south, east or west than any other location:

 Northernmost point – Cap Takouch, Annaba Province or Cap Bougaroûn, Skikda province
 Easternmost point – the tripoint with Niger and Libya, Djanet Province
 Southernmost point – unnamed location on the border with Mali east of the Malian village of In-Abalen, Adrar Province
 Westernmost point – the western section of the border with Morocco/Western Sahara, Tindouf Province (Note: Algeria does not have a westernmost point, the border being formed by a line of longitude)

See also
 List of cities in Algeria
 Teffedest Mountains

References